Mirza Tahir is a village and Union Council of Gujrat District, in the Punjab province of Pakistan. It is the second richest village in Tehsil Kharian. The main source of livelihood of the people  is agriculture but majority of the persons are living in abroad.richest village karianwala

Demographics
Population of the village is 4000; ratio of the male and female is 40% and 60%. Mirza Tahir having a high school-Govt High school Mirza Tahir and a Girls elementary high school. A poorly equipped medical centre is also there that provides basic health facilities to general public.

References 

Populated places in Gujrat District